Altyaghach National Park — is a national park of Azerbaijan. It is about 120 km away from the capital Baku.

It was founded with the aim of restoring the rich diversity of flora and fauna in the region. Most of the park is covered with deciduous forests.

Flora and fauna

Flora

The area of Altyaghach is 90.5% covered by temperate deciduous broadleaved forests. The major types of trees are Persian Ironwood (Parrotia persica), Caucasian Oak (Quercus macranthera), Caucasian Ash (Fraxinus angustifolia subsp. oxycarpa), European Hornbeam (Carpinus betulus), Oriental Hornbeam (Carpinus orientalis), Oriental Beech (Fagus orientalis), Silver Birch (Betula pendula), White Birch (Betula pubescens), etc.

Shrub species occurring in the area include Various-Leaved Hawthorn (Crataegus heterophylla), Dog Rose (Rosa canina), Blackberry (Rubus fruticosus), etc.

Fauna

The national park is home to the rare East Caucasian tur (Capra cylindricornis), a mountain dwelling goat antelope found only in the eastern half of the Caucasus Mountains. Other large mammals found here are the lynx (Lynx lynx), brown bear (Ursus arctos), wild boar (Sus scrofa), wolf (Canis lupus), golden jackal (Canis aureus), jungle cat (Felis chaus), red fox (Vulpes vulpes), roe deer (Capreolus capreolus), badger (Meles meles), and otter (Lutra lutra), etc.

See also
 Nature of Azerbaijan
 National Parks of Azerbaijan
 State Reserves of Azerbaijan
 List of protected areas of Azerbaijan

References

External links

 Altyaghach National Park Official Website - Ministry of Ecology and Natural Resources of Azerbaijan 
 National Parks: Altyaghach National Park - Ministry of Ecology and Natural Resources of Azerbaijan 

IUCN Category II
National parks of Azerbaijan
Forests of Azerbaijan
Protected areas established in 2004
2004 establishments in Azerbaijan